Gheorghe Constantinide (November 13, 1928 – October 14, 2003) was a Romanian basketball player who competed in the 1952 Summer Olympics.

References

1928 births
2003 deaths
Basketball players at the 1952 Summer Olympics
Olympic basketball players of Romania
Romanian men's basketball players